Chryssa Vardea-Mavromichali (December 31, 1933 – December 23, 2013) was a Greek American artist who worked in a wide variety of media. An American art pioneer in light art and luminist sculpture, known for her neon, steel, aluminum and acrylic glass installations,  she always used the mononym Chryssa professionally. She worked from the mid-1950s in New York City studios and worked since 1992 in the studio she established in Neos Kosmos, Athens, Greece.

Biography
Chryssa was born in Athens into the famous Mavromichalis family from the Mani Peninsula.  Her family, while not rich, was educated and cultured; one of her sisters, who studied medicine, was a friend of the poet and novelist Nikos Kazantzakis.

Chryssa began painting during her teenage years and also studied to be a social worker.  In 1953, on the advice of a Greek art critic, her family sent her to Paris to study at the Académie de la Grande Chaumière  where André Breton, Edgard Varèse, and Max Ernst were among her associates and Alberto Giacometti was a visiting professor.

In 1954, at age twenty-one, Chryssa sailed for the United States, arrived in New York, and went to San Francisco to study at the California School of Fine Arts.  Returning to New York in 1955, she became a United States citizen and established a studio in the city. The same year she married fellow artist Jean Varda and moved to Sausalito. The couple separated in 1958 and divorced in 1965.

Her image is included in the iconic 1972 poster Some Living American Women Artists by Mary Beth Edelson.

At the age of 79, Chryssa died of heart-related problems, in Athens, Greece, on December 23, 2013.

Major works and milestones
 1957
Chryssa's first major work was The Cycladic Books, a series of plaster reliefs which the French art critic Pierre Restany described as having produced "the purified and stylized geometric relief which is characteristic of Cycladic sculpture."  According to the American art historian and critic Barbara Rose, The Cycladic Books preceded American minimalism by seventeen years.

 1958
Arrow: Homage to Times Square is a large 8 ft by  work in painted cast aluminum.  In a 2005 interview in Vouliagmeni,   Chryssa said:  "I only ever kept one work for more than 15 years in my studio, "The Arrow" – it is now in Albany, in the Rockefeller Collection."

 1961
Chryssa's first solo exhibition was mounted at The Guggenheim.

 1962
Times Square Sky is a 5 ft ×  × 9.5 in work in neon, aluminum and steel. It is now in the Walker Art Center in Minneapolis, Minnesota.

 1963
Chryssa's work was shown at the Museum of Modern Art  in curator Dorothy Canning Miller's Americans 1963 exhibition. The artists represented in the show also included Richard Anuszkiewicz, Lee Bontecou, Robert Indiana, Richard Lindner, Marisol, Claes Oldenburg, Ad Reinhardt, James Rosenquist and others.

 1966
The Gates to Times Square, regarded as "one of the most important American sculptures of all time" and "a thrilling homage to the living American culture of advertising and mass communications",  is a 10 ft cube installation of two huge letter As through which visitors may walk into "a gleaming block of stainless steel and Plexiglas that seems to quiver in the play of pale blue neon light" which is controlled by programmed timers. First shown in Manhattan's Pace Gallery, it was given to the Albright-Knox Art Gallery in Buffalo, New York in 1972.

 1967–1968
Clytemnestra is in the Corcoran Gallery of Art collection in Washington, D.C.  It is based on the anguish of Clytemnestra, upon learning that her daughter would be sacrificed by Agamemnon,  as portrayed by Chryssa's friend Irene Papas in the Michael Cacoyannis production of Iphigeneia at Aulis on Broadway. This work, or another version of it, has also been installed outside the Megaron Concert Hall in Athens.

 1972
The Whitney Museum of American Art  mounted a solo exhibition of works by Chryssa.

That's All (early 1970s),  the central panel of a triptych related to The Gates of Times Square,  was acquired by the Museum of Modern Art between 1975 and 1979.

 1973
Chryssa's solo exhibition at the Gallerie Denise René was reviewed for Time magazine by art critic Robert Hughes before it went on to the Galleries Denise René in Düsseldorf and Paris.

Received the Guggenheim fellowship.

 1980
Chryssa's 70 ft (21 m) Untitled Light Sculpture, six large 'W's connected by cables and programmed electronically to create changing patterns of light through 900 feet of neon tubing, is suspended in the atrium of 33 West Monroe,  a Skidmore, Owings & Merrill design and its former headquarters, in Chicago, Illinois.

 
 1983
Mott Street,  named for Mott Street in Chinatown, Manhattan, is a large work in dark aluminium and red-toned neon light which is installed in the Evangelismos station of the Athens Metro.

Other works by Chryssa in composite honeycomb aluminum and neon in the 1980s and 1990s include Chinatown, Siren, Urban Traffic, and Flapping Birds.

1990
Chryssa 60/90 retrospective exhibition in Athens in the Mihalarias Art Center. After her long absence from Greece, a major exhibition including large aluminum sculptures – cityscapes, "neon boxes" from the Gates to the Times Square, paintings, drawings etc. was held in Athens.

 1992
In 1992, after closing her SoHo studio, which art dealer Leo Castelli had described as "one of the loveliest in the world,"  Chryssa returned to Greece. She found a derelict cinema which had become a storeroom stacked with abandoned school desks and chairs, behind the old Fix Brewery near the city center in Neos Kosmos, Athens.  Using the desks to construct enormous benches, she converted the space into a studio for working on designs and aluminum composite honeycomb sculptures.   The Athens National Museum of Contemporary Art, which was founded in 2000 and owns Chryssa's Cycladic Books, is in the process of converting the Fix Brewery into its permanent premises.

 2005
Chryssa presented her paintings at the Mihalarias Art Center.

Monographs
A partial listing of monographs on Chryssa's work:
 1997: Barbara Rose. Chryssa: Cycladic Books 1957–1962. Greece: Goulandris Museum of Cycladic Art 
 1968:  Diane Waldman.  Chryssa: Selected Works 1955–1967.  New York: Pace Gallery (48 pp.)  .
 1974: Sam Hunter.  Chryssa.  New York: Harry N. Abrams, Inc. (76 pp.)  .
 1977: Pierre Restany.  Chryssa.  New York: Harry N. Abrams, Inc. (274 pp.)  .
 1983: Douglas Schultz.  Chryssa: Urban Icons. Buffalo: Albright-Knox (170 pp.)  .
 1990: Douglas Schultz.  Chryssa: Cityscapes.  London: Thames & Hudson (162 pp.)  .

Exhibitions and collections
Partial listings of exhibitions and institutions with works by Chryssa in permanent collections:

Solo exhibitions
 1961: Solomon R. Guggenheim Museum
 1965: Institute of Contemporary Art, Philadelphia
 1968: Harvard University
 1972: Whitney Museum of American Art
 1979: Musée d'Art Moderne de la Ville de Paris

Group exhibitions
 1961: Le Nouveau Réalisme à Paris et à New York, Galerie Rive Droite, Paris, June 1961
 1963: Museum of Modern Art
 1977: Documenta '77 in Kassel
 1991: Princeton University Art Museum
 1997: Leo Castelli Gallery 
 2000, 2003 & 2005: European Cultural Center of Delphi
 2007: Hirshhorn Museum and Sculpture Garden
 2017: documenta 14

Collections
 Albright-Knox Art Gallery
 Boca Raton Museum of Art 
 Corcoran Gallery of Art
 The Governor Nelson A. Rockefeller Empire State Plaza Art Collection
 Hirshhorn Museum and Sculpture Garden
 Macedonian Museum of Contemporary Art in Thessaloniki
 Museum of Modern Art
 National Museum of Contemporary Art in Athens
 National Gallery of Athens
 Walker Art Center
 Whitney Museum of American Art

Additional exhibitions and collections are listed by the Artforum Culture Foundation,  AskART.com,  and other sources.

References
Although Chryssa always used the mononym professionally, some fine arts and art auction references nevertheless cite her as Chryssa Vardea, Vardea Chryssa, Chryssa Varda, or Varda Chryssa.

1933 births
2013 deaths
20th-century American women artists
20th-century Greek women artists
21st-century American women artists
21st-century Greek women artists
Alumni of the Académie de la Grande Chaumière
20th-century American sculptors
Artists from Athens
Greek emigrants to the United States
Greek sculptors
Neon artists
20th-century Greek sculptors
20th-century Greek Americans
21st-century American sculptors